Trégorrois Breton is the dialect of Breton spoken in Trégor ( in Breton).

Distinguishing characteristics
Trégorrois differs from other varieties of the language in a number of ways:

 It always uses the possessive  (often pronounced ) whereas the other dialects use  before l,  before n,d,t,h and vowels, and  before all others (these other forms are nonetheless understood because of exposure to hymns and songs, for instance)
 After the possessive , Trégorrois makes a sibilant variation (e.g., where Vannetais uses /hon tu/, or Cornouaillais and Léonard , Trégorrois says )
 The h is very aspirated (e.g., in )
 Different from Léonard, z is generally not pronounced (nor is it in Cornouaillais and Vannetais)
 The tonic accent is very strong (for example,  is pronounced /b:in/)
 Certain constructions are preferred. For instance,  or  instead of 
 Frequently the 'd' will not mutate into a z where it would in the other dialects (for example)
 The glyph w is generally pronounced ou (e.g.,  is pronounced /uar/), unlike Léonard dialect where it is pronounced /v/

There are several other pronunciation details. For example,  is pronounced /ãn heul/ (compare to the /ar mur/ of Kemper). This is possible in Trégorrois because the very strong aspiration of /h/ avoids any confusion with the word 'oil'.

Finally, future endings are different.

Source
This article is based on the French-language Wikipedia's article: Breton trégorrois.

External links
Ethnologue: Breton Uses the dialect names listed in this article
Omniglot: Breton language, alphabet and pronunciation Refers to the dialects as Kerneveg (Cornouaille), Leoneg (Leon), Tregerieg (Tregor), and Gwenedeg (Vannetais)
Breizh.net A "non-profit association whose objective is the promotion of Brittany and the Breton language on the web"
6th Annual Conference of the North American Association for Celtic Language Teachers, The Information Age, Celtic Languages and the New Millennium Includes a brief overview of Breton history and dialects

Breton language
Breton, Tregorrois